In complex analysis, the (open) right half-plane is the set of all points in the complex plane whose real part is strictly positive, that is, the set .

References 

 Rudin, W., Real and Complex Analysis, 3 ed. (McGraw-Hill, 1986).
 Ahlfors, L., Complex Analysis, 3 ed. (McGraw-Hill, 1979).
 Kato, T., Perturbation theory for linear operators, 2 ed. (Springer-Verlag, 1995)

Complex analysis